Dylan Hondo (born 28 May 1995) is a Zimbabwean cricketer. He is a left-handed batsman and a left-arm orthodox bowler. He made his first class debut against SL Dev EM XI  He made his List A debut on 14 February 2020 for Rangers in the 2019–20 Pro50 Championship.

References

External links
 

1995 births
Living people
Zimbabwean cricketers
Rangers cricketers